Baco Airport  is a new airport serving Jinka and Baco, Ethiopia.

See also

Transport in Ethiopia
List of airports in Ethiopia

References

External links
OpenStreetMap - Jinka
OurAirports - Baco Airport
FallingRain - Jinka

Airports in Ethiopia
Southern Nations, Nationalities, and Peoples' Region